Ho West is one of the constituencies represented in the Parliament of Ghana. It elects one Member of Parliament (MP) by the first past the post system of election. Ho West is located is in the Ho West District of the Volta Region of Ghana. Its capital is Dzolokpuita.

Boundaries
The seat is located entirely within the Ho West District of the Volta Region of Ghana. It shade a common boundary with the Ho municipality to the south, the south Dayi to the north west and the Afadzato south to the north east. Ho West also stretches to its south eastern boundary with the Adaklu and the North Tongu district in there Volta region

Members of Parliament

Elections

See also
List of Ghana Parliament constituencies

References

External links 
Adam Carr's Election Archives
Ghana Home Page
Ho West District

Parliamentary constituencies in the Volta Region